Tiglieto is a comune (municipality) in the Metropolitan City of Genoa in the Italian region Liguria, located about  northwest of Genoa.

Tiglieto borders the following municipalities: Campo Ligure, Genoa, Masone, Molare, Ponzone, Rossiglione, Sassello, Urbe.

History
In 1120 Tiglieto Abbey was the first Cistercian monastery to be founded in Italy. Its monks went on to found Staffarda Abbey, near Saluzzo, and Casanova Abbey.

Main sights 
Part of the municipality territory is within the boundaries of the Parco naturale regionale del Beigua.

References

External links
 Official website

Cities and towns in Liguria